This list of the Mesozoic life of Texas contains the various prehistoric life-forms whose fossilized remains have been reported from within the US state of Texas and are between 252.17 and 66 million years of age.

A

  †Acanthoceras
 †Acanthoceras adkinsi
 †Acanthoceras amphibolum
 †Acanthoceras barcusi
 †Acanthoceras eulessanum
 †Acanthoceras johnsonanum
 †Acanthoceras tarrantense
 †Acanthoceras tarrantense nitidum
 †Acanthoceras wintoni
 †Acanthoceras worthense
 Acesta
 †Acesta sayeri
 †Acesta sayrei
 Acila
 †Acila chicotana
 Acirsa
 †Acirsa flexicostata – tentative report
 Acmaea
 †Acmaea occidentalis
 †Acmaea pilleolus
  †Acompsoceras
  †Acrocanthosaurus
 †Acrocanthosaurus atokensis
 †Acrosmilia
 Acteon
 †Acteon nitidus – tentative report
 †Acteon throckmortoni
 †Acteonella
 †Acteonella delgadoi
 †Acteonella pecosensis
 †Acteonella sublaevis – or unidentified comparable form
 †Actinacis
 †Actinacis valverdensis – type locality for species
 †Actinastrea
 †Actinastrea guadalupae
 †Actinostreon
 †Actinostreon gregareum
 †Acutostrea
 †Acutostrea plumosa
  †Adelobasileus – type locality for genus
 †Adelobasileus cromptoni – type locality for species
 †Adinodon
 †Adinodon pattersoni – type locality for species
 †Adkinsella – type locality for genus
 †Adkinsella edwardsensis – type locality for species
 †Adkinsia
 †Adkinsia bosquensis – type locality for species
 †Adkinsia knikerae – type locality for species
  †Adocus
 †Aenona
 †Aenona eufaulensis
 †Aetodactylus – type locality for genus
 †Aetodactylus halli – type locality for species
  †Agerostrea
 †Agerostrea mesenterica
 †Aguileria
 †Aguileria cumminsi
  †Agujaceratops
 †Agujaceratops mariscalensis – type locality for species
  †Akera
 †Akera constricta
   †Alamosaurus
 †Alamosaurus sanjuanensis
  †Albanerpeton
 †Albanerpeton arthridion – type locality for species
 †Albanerpeton gracilis
 †Albanerpeton nexuosus
 †Aliofusus
 †Aliofusus balaniformis
 †Aliofusus reagani
 †Aliofusus reagani subtilis
 †Aliofusus reagani tumidus
 †Aliomactra
 †Aliomactra compressa
 †Alkaidia – type locality for genus
 †Alkaidia sumralli – type locality for species
  †Allocrioceras
 †Allocrioceras annulatum
 †Allocrioceras dentonense
 †Allocrioceras larvatum
 Alnus
 †Alnus trina
  †Alphadon
 †Alphadon halleyi – or unidentified comparable form
 †Alphadon perexiguus – type locality for species
 †Altairia – type locality for genus
 †Altairia wintoni
 †Amaurellina
 †Amaurellina stephensoni
 †Ambigostrea
 †Ambigostrea tecticosta
 †Ambrosea
 †Ambrosea nitida
 Ammobaculites
 †Ammobaculites subcretaceous
 †Ammobaculites subcretaceus
  †Ampullina – or unidentified comparable form
 †Ampullina abnormalis
 †Ampullina densatus
 †Ampullina lirata
 Amuletum
 †Amuletum boylei
 †Amuletum curvocostatum
 †Amuletum venustum
  Amusium
 †Amusium danei – tentative report
 †Anacolosidites
 †Anaklinoceras
 †Anaklinoceras reflexum
 †Anatimya
 †Anatimya anteradiata
 †Anatimya anteradiata texana
 †Anatimya eulessana
 †Anatimya longula
 †Anchura
 †Anchura bexarensis
 †Anchura caddoensis
 †Anchura campbelli
 †Anchura elegans
 †Anchura hoggi
 †Anchura lamari
 †Anchura modesta
 †Anchura noackensis
 †Anchura noakensis – tentative report
 †Anchura substriata
 †Anchura turricula
 †Anchura whitneyensis
  †Ancilla
 †Ancilla acutula
  †Angistorhinus
 †Angistorhinus alticephalus – type locality for species
 †Angistorhinus grandis
  †Angulomastacator – type locality for genus
 †Angulomastacator daviesi – type locality for species
 †Anisoceras
 †Anisoceras armatum
 †Anisoceras perarmatum
 †Anisomyon
 †Anisomyon borealis – tentative report
 †Anisomyon haydeni
 †Anomalina
 †Anomalina petita
 †Anomalina torcerensis
 †Anomalofusus
 †Anomalofusus bellulus
 †Anomalofusus lemniscatus
 Anomia
 †Anomia argentaria
 †Anomia mexicana
 †Anomia ornata
 †Anomia ponticulana
 †Anomia tellinoides
 †Anomoeodus
 †Anomotodon
 †Anomotodon toddi – type locality for species
 †Antillocaprina
 †Apachesaurus
 †Apachesaurus gregorii
 †Aphrodina
 †Aphrodina navarroana
 †Aphrodina tippana
 Aplousina
 †Apsgnathus – type locality for genus
 †Apsgnathus triptodon – type locality for species
 †Aquilarhinus – type locality for genus
 †Aquilarhinus palimentus – type locality for species
 Arca
 †Arca martindalensis
 †Arca pergracilis
 †Arca rostellata
 †Arca securiculata
  Architectonica
 †Architectonica voragiformis
 Arcopsis
 †Arcopsis nolani
 †Arctostrea
 †Arctostrea falacata
 †Areopsammia – type locality for genus
 †Areopsammia bakerae – type locality for species
  †Arganodus
 †Arganodus dorotheae – type locality for species
 Arrhoges
 †Arrhoges cibolensis
 †Arrhoges ciboloensis
 †Arrhoges lobata media
 †Arrhoges plenocosta
 †Asciocythere
 †Asciocythere rotunda
  †Aspidoceras
 †Aspidoceras laevigatum
 †Astacodes
 †Astacodes davisi
 †Astacodes maxwelli
 †Astandes
 Astarte
 †Astarte culebrensis
 †Astarte malonensis
 †Astartemya
 †Astartemya fentressensis
  Astrangia
 †Astrangia cretacea
 †Astrangia lamarensis – type locality for species
 Astreopora – tentative report
 †Astreopora leightoni – type locality for species
 †Astrocoenia
 †Astrocoenia budaensis – type locality for species
 †Astrocoenia nidiformis
 †Astrocoenia scyphoidea – type locality for species
 †Astroconodon – type locality for genus
 †Astroconodon denisoni – type locality for species
 †Astrocratis – type locality for genus
 †Astrocratis acutispina – type locality for species
  †Astrodon
 †Astrodon johnstoni
 †Astrophocaudia – type locality for genus
 †Astrophocaudia slaughteri – type locality for species
 †Atreta
 †Atreta minor
 †Aulastraeopora – type locality for genus
 †Aulastraeopora harrisi – type locality for species
 †Axonoceras
 †Axonoceras compressum
 †Axonoceras multicostatum
 †Axonoceras multicostatum rotundum
 †Axonoceras pingue
 †Axosmilia
 †Axosmilia craginiana – type locality for species
 †Axosmilia whitneyi – type locality for species

B

  †Baculites
 †Baculites aquilaensis - or unidentified loosely related form
 †Baculites claviformis
 †Baculites haresi – or unidentified comparable form
 †Baculites ovatus
 †Baculites scotti
 †Baculites taylorensis
 †Baculites tippahensis
 †Baculites undatus
 †Baena – report made of unidentified related form or using admittedly obsolete nomenclature
 †Banis
 †Banis siniformis
 Barbatia – tentative report
 †Barbatia carolinensis
 †Barroisiceras
  †Basilemys
 †Bathycyathus – tentative report
 †Bathycyathus lloydi – type locality for species
 †Bathytormus
 †Bathytormus pteropsis
  †Belemnitella
 †Belemnitella americana
 †Bellifusus
 †Bellifusus angulicostatus – or unidentified related form
 †Bellifusus buffaloensis
 †Bellifusus coronatus
 †Bellifusus crassicostatus
 †Bellifusus deatsvillensis
 †Bellifusus multicostatus
 †Bellifusus robustus
 †Bellifusus tennistriatus
 †Belliscala
 †Belliscala crideri
 †Belliscala forbeyi
 †Belliscala rockensis
 †Belodon
 †Belodon superciliosus – type locality for species
  †Belonostomus
 †Beretra
 †Beretra contracta
 †Beretra elongata
 †Beretra firma
 †Beretra ornatula
 †Beretra ripleyana
 †Beretra striata
  †Bernissartia – tentative report
  †Betelgeusia – type locality for genus
 †Betelgeusia reidi – type locality for species
 †Borissiakoceras
 †Borissiakoceras orbiculatum
  †Bostrychoceras
 †Bostrychoceras polyplocum
 Botula
 †Botula carolinensis
 †Botula conchafodentis
 †Botula plumosa
  †Brachauchenius
 †Brachauchenius lucasi
 Brachidontes
 †Brachidontes arlingtonanus
 †Brachidontes filisculptus
 †Brachidontes filisculptus microcostae
 †Brachidontes fulpensis
 Brachiodontes
  †Brachychampsa
 †Brachycythere – tentative report
 †Brachycythere subconcentrica
 †Brachyrhizodus – type locality for genus
 †Brachyrhizodus wichitaensis – type locality for species
  †Brachysuchus – type locality for genus
 †Brachysuchus megalodon – type locality for species
  †Bravoceratops – type locality for genus
 †Bravoceratops polyphemus – type locality for species
 †Breviarca
 †Breviarca grandis
 †Breviarca habita
 †Breviarca minor
 †Breviarca nolani
 †Breviarca plummeri
  †Brontopodus – type locality for genus
 †Brontopodus birdi – type locality for species
 †Buccinopsis
 †Buccinopsis crassa
 †Buccinopsis crassicostata
 †Buccinopsis crassus
 †Buccinopsis globosa
 †Buccinopsis greenensis
 †Buccinopsis perryi
 †Buccinopsis solida
 †Budaia – type locality for genus
 †Budaia travisensis – type locality for species
 †Budaiceras
 †Budaiceras alticarinatum
 †Budaiceras elegantior
 †Budaiceras hyatti
 †Burckhardtites
 †Burckhardtites palmensis
 Busycon – tentative report

C

 Cadulus
 †Cadulus coonensis
 †Cadulus obnutus
 †Cadulus praetenuis
 Caestocorbula
 †Caestocorbula crassaplica
 †Caestocorbula crassiplica
 †Caestocorbula suffalciata
 †Caestocorbula terramaria
 †Caestocorbula torta
 †Caestocorbula williardi
 Callianassa
 †Calliomphalus
 †Calliomphalus americanus
 †Calliomphalus bellulus
 †Calliomphalus microcancelli
 Callistina
 †Callistina alta
 †Callistina lamarensis
 †Callistina munda
 †Callistina taffi
 †Callodus – type locality for genus
 †Callodus coronatus – type locality for species
 Callucina
 †Callucina chatfieldana
 †Callucina oleodorsum
 †Callucina seminalis
 †Calyptosuchus – type locality for genus
 †Calyptosuchus wellesi – type locality for species
  Calyptraea
 †Camptonectes
 †Camptonectes bellisculptus
 †Camptonectes bubonis
 †Camptonectes burlingtonensis
 †Camptonectes cavanus
 †Camptonectes ellsworthensis
 †Camptonectes kaufmanensis
 †Camptonectes martinsensis
  Cancellaria
 †Cancellaria matroni – tentative report
 †Cantabrigites
 †Cantabrigites spinosum
 †Cantabrigites subsimplex – or unidentified related form
 Cantharus – tentative report
 †Cantioscyllium
 †Cantioscyllium meyeri – type locality for species
 †Capellia – type locality for genus
 †Capellia mauricei – type locality for species
  †Caprina
 †Caprina coraloidea
 †Caprina douvillei
 †Caprinuloidea
 †Caprinuloidea multitubifera
 †Caprinuloidea perfecta
  Capulus
 †Capulus cuthandensis
 †Capulus erectus
 †Capulus microstriatus – tentative report
 †Capulus spangleri
  Carcharias
 †Carcharias heathi – type locality for species
 †Carcharias holmdelensis
 †Carcharias samhammeri – or unidentified comparable form
 †Cardiaster
 †Cardiaster leonensis
 Cardium
 †Cardium wadei
 †Caririchnium
 †Caririchnium protohadrosaurichnos – type locality for species
 Carota
 †Carota biplicata
 †Carota pendula
 †Carota robusta
 †Carycorbula
 †Carycorbula martinae
 Caryocorbula
 †Caryocorbula ovisana
 †Caryocorbula tradingensis
 †Caryocorbula varia
  Caryophyllia
 †Caryophyllia comanchei – type locality for species
 †Caryophyllia dentonensis – type locality for species
 †Caryophyllia konincki – type locality for species
 †Caseosaurus – type locality for genus
 †Caseosaurus crosbyensis – type locality for species
 †Casierius
 †Casierius heckeli
 †Casierius heckelii
 †Catactegenys – type locality for genus
 †Catactegenys solaster – type locality for species
 †Catastomocystis
 †Catastomocystis spinosa
  †Caturus
 †Caveola
 †Caveola acuta – tentative report
 †Caveola bellsana
 †Caveola producta
 †Cedarosaurus
 †Cedarosaurus weiskopfae
 †Cenomanocarcinus
 †Cenomanocarcinus refroae
 †Cenomanocarcinus renfroae
 †Cenomanocarcinus vanstraeleni
  †Ceratodus
 †Ceratodus americanus – or unidentified comparable form
 Ceratotrochus – tentative report
 †Ceriopora
  Cerithiella
 †Cerithiella nodoliratum – or unidentified related form
 †Cerithiella semirugatum
  Cerithium
 †Cerithium simpsonensis
 †Chamops
  †Champsosaurus
 †Chartecytis
 †Cheloniceras
 †Cheloniceras adkinsi
 †Cheloniceras cornuelianum
  †Chindesaurus
 †Chindesaurus bryansmalli
  †Chinlea
 †Chinlea sorenseni
 †Chirostenotes
 †Chondrodonta
 †Chondrodonta glabra
 †Chondrodonta munsoni
 †Chondrodonta youngi – type locality for species
  †Chupacabrachelys – type locality for genus
 †Chupacabrachelys complexus – type locality for species
  Cidaris
 †Cidaris hemigranosus
 †Cidaris texanus
  †Cimexomys
 †Cimoliasaurus
  †Cimoliopterus
 †Cimoliopterus dunni – type locality for species
 †Cimolodon
 †Cimolodon electus – or unidentified comparable form
  †Cimolomys
 †Cimolomys clarki
 †Cinulia
 †Cinulia tarrantensis – or unidentified related form
 †Cionichthys
 †Cionichthys greeni – type locality for species
 †Citharina
 †Citharina kochii
 †Cladoceramus
 †Cladoceramus undulatoplicatus
 †Cladophyllia
 †Cladophyllia furcifera
 †Clavipholas
 †Clavipholas pectorosa
 †Clavipholas whitfieldi
  †Clevosaurus – or unidentified comparable form
 †Clevosaurus latidens
  †Clidastes
 †Clidastes liodontus
  Cliona
 †Cliona microtuberum
 †Cliona retiformis
 †Clisocolus
 †Clisocolus concentricum
 †Coahomasuchus – type locality for genus
 †Coahomasuchus kahleorum – type locality for species
 †Coahuilites – tentative report
 †Coalcomana
 †Coalcomana ramosa
 †Codiopsis
 †Codiopsis stephensoni – type locality for species
  †Coelodus
 †Coelodus decaturensis – type locality for species
 †Coelodus fabadens – type locality for species
  †Coelophysis
 †Coelosmilia
 †Coelosmilia americana
 †Coelosmilia texana
 †Coilopoceras
 †Coilopoceras springeri
  †Collignoniceras
 †Collignoniceras woollgari
 †Colognathus – type locality for genus
 †Colognathus obscurus – type locality for species
 †Colombiceras
 †Colombiceras robustum
 †Columbiceras
 †Columbiceras robustus
 †Comptoniaster
 †Comptoniaster adamsi
 †Confusiscala – tentative report
 †Coniasaurus
 †Coniasaurus crassidens
 †Connectastrea – tentative report
 †Connectastrea infundibuliformis – type locality for species
 Conopeum
  †Continuoolithus
  †Conulus
 †Conulus stephensoni – type locality for species
 †Convolosaurus – type locality for genus
 †Convolosaurus marri – type locality for species
  Corbicula
  Corbula
 †Corbula amniculana
 †Corbula dentonensis
 †Corbula inflata
 †Corbula linteroidea
 †Corbula ponsana
 †Corbula pulvinata
 †Corbula rockensis
 †Corbula senecta
 †Corbula starana
 †Corbula subradiata
 †Corbula subradiata texana
 †Corbula torta – or unidentified related form
 †Corbula williardi – tentative report
 †Corbula woodi
 †Coskinolinoides
 †Coskinolinoides texanus
 †Costellacesta
 †Costellacesta sayrei
 †Coupatezia
 †Coupatezia turneri – type locality for species
 †Craginia
 †Craginia turriformis
 Crassatella
 †Crassatella hodgei
 †Crassatella quinlanensis
 †Crassatella vadosa
 †Crassatella vadosa bexarensis
 †Crassatella vadosa cedarensis
 †Crassatella vadosa chatfieldensis
 †Crassatella vadosa manorensis
  Crassostrea
 †Crassostrea cortex
 †Crassostrea cusseta
 †Crassostrea trigonalis
 †Crateraster
 †Crateraster quinqueloba
 †Crateraster texensis
 †Crenella
 †Crenella elegantula
 †Crenella serica
 †Crenella subcircularis
 †Creonella
 †Creonella deusseni
 †Creonella triplicata
 †Creonella whitei
 †Cretacoranina
 †Cretacoranina dichrous
  †Cretolamna
 †Cretolamna appendiculata
 †Cretolamna maroccana
 †Cretorectolobus
 †Cretorectolobus olsoni – or unidentified comparable form
  †Crosbysaurus – type locality for genus
 †Crosbysaurus harrisae – type locality for species
 Ctena
 †Ctena parvilineata
  Cucullaea
 †Cucullaea blanpiedi
 †Cucullaea capax
 †Cucullaea deatvillensis
 †Cucullaea kingsensis
 †Cucullaea murrayi
 †Cucullaea powersi
 †Cuna
 †Cuna texana
 †Curtocaprina – type locality for genus
 †Curtocaprina clabaughikinsorum – type locality for species
 Cuspidaria
 †Cuspidaria alaeformis
 †Cuspidaria ampulla
 †Cuspidaria grandis
 †Cuspidaria grovensis
 †Cyathomorpha – tentative report
 †Cyathomorpha damoni – type locality for species
 †Cyathophora
 †Cyathophora haysensis – type locality for species
 †Cyathophora olssoni – type locality for species
 †Cyclorisma
 †Cyclorisma orbiculata
 †Cyclorisma parva
 †Cyclorisma pumila
 †Cyclothyris
 †Cyclothyris americana
 Cylichna
 †Cylichna incisa
 †Cylichna secalina
  †Cymatoceras
 †Cymatoceras hilli – or unidentified comparable form
 †Cymatoceras texanum
 †Cymbophora
 †Cymbophora appressa
 †Cymbophora berryi
 †Cymbophora cancellosa
 †Cymbophora inflata
 †Cymbophora puteana
 †Cymbophora saccellana
 †Cymbophora scabellum
 †Cymbophora schucherti
 †Cymbophora securis
 †Cymbophora simpsonensis
 †Cymbophora spooneri
 †Cymbophora subtilis
 †Cymbophora wordeni
 †Cymella
 †Cymella bella
 †Cymella bella texana
 †Cymella ironensis
 †Cypridae
 †Cypridae wyomingensis – or unidentified related form
 †Cyprimeria
 †Cyprimeria alta
 †Cyprimeria coonensis
 †Cyprimeria depressa
 †Cyprimeria patella
 Cythere
 †Cythere concentrica
 †Cythereis
 †Cythereis dentonensis
 †Cythereis hawleyi
 †Cythereis nuda
 †Cythereis ornatissima
 †Cythereis paupera
 †Cythereis pustulosissima
 †Cythereis worthensis
 Cytherella
 †Cytherella comanchensis
 Cytherelloidea
 †Cytherelloidea reticulata
 †Cytherelloidea williamsoniana
 Cytheropteron
 †Cytheropteron rugosalatum
 Cyzicus – tentative report
 †Cyzicus shupei

D

  †Dallasaurus – type locality for genus
 †Dallasaurus turneri – type locality for species
 †Darwinula
 Dasmosmilia
 †Dasmosmilia kochii – type locality for species
 Dasyatis
 †Dasyatis commercensis – type locality for species
 †Dathmila
 †Dathmila lineola
 †Dawsonius
 †Dawsonius tigris
  †Deinosuchus
 †Deinosuchus riograndensis
 †Deinosuchus rugosus – type locality for species
 †Deltaichthys
 †Deltaichthys albuloides
 †Dendrosmilia – tentative report
 †Dendrosmilia texana
 †Denebia – type locality for genus
 †Denebia americana
 Dentalina
 †Dentalina communis
 Dentalium
 †Dentalium inornatum
 †Dentalium leve
 †Dentalium minor
 †Dentalium navarroi
 †Dentalium pauperculum
 †Dentalium sublineatum
 †Dentalium vaughani
 †Dentonia
 †Dentonia leveretti
  †Desmatosuchus
 †Desmatosuchus haplocerus
 †Desmatosuchus smalli – type locality for species
 †Desmatosuchus spurensis – type locality for species
  †Desmoceras
 †Deussenia
 †Deussenia bellalirata
 †Deussenia ciboloensis
 †Deussenia corbis
 †Deussenia multilirae
 †Deussenia travisana
 †Dhondtichlamys
 †Dhondtichlamys venustus
 †Dichastopollenites
 †Dictyoconus
 †Dictyoconus walnutensis
 †Dimorpharaea
 †Dimorpharaea manchacaensis – type locality for species
 †Dimorphastrea
 †Dimorphastrea stantoni – type locality for species
 †Dinogymnium
 †Dinogymnium acuminatum
 †Dinogymnium euclaense
 Diodora – tentative report
 †Diodora bartonvillensis
  †Diphydontosaurus – or unidentified related form
  †Diploastrea
 †Diploastrea harrisi – type locality for species
 †Diploastrea hilli – type locality for species
 †Diploastrea vaughani – type locality for species
 †Diplolonchidion – type locality for genus
 †Diplolonchidion murryi – type locality for species
 †Diplomoceras
 †Diplomoceras trabeatus
 †Discofascigera
 Discorbis
 †Discorbis correcta
 †Discorbis minima
  †Discoscaphites
 †Discoscaphites conradi
 †Discoscaphites erucoideus
 †Distefanella – or unidentified comparable form
  †Dolichorhynchops
 †Dolichorhynchops bonneri
 !-- Doswellia: Automatic taxobox --> †Doswellia
  †Douvilleiceras
 †Douvilleiceras grandense
 †Douvilleiceras mammillatum
 †Douvilleiceras offarcinatum – or unidentified comparable form
 †Douvilleiceras orbignyi – or unidentified comparable form
 †Douvilleiceras quitmanense
 †Douvilleiceras rex
 †Douvilleiceras spathi
 †Douvillelia – tentative report
 †Douvillelia skeltoni
  †Dreissena
 †Dreissena tippana
 †Drepanocheilus
 †Drepanocheilus corbetensis
 †Drepanocheilus cuthandensis
 †Drepanocheilus texanus
 †Drepanochilus
 †Drepanochilus corbetensis
 †Drepanochilus davidsi
 †Drepanochilus martini
 †Drepanochilus texanus
 †Drepanochilus triliratus
 †Drilluta
 †Drilluta brevispira
 †Drilluta crassicostata
 †Drilluta crassicostata longa
 †Drilluta distans
 †Drilluta major – or unidentified comparable form
 †Drilluta paucicostata
  †Dromomeron
 †Dromomeron gregorii – type locality for species
 †Dryptosaurus
  †Dufrenoyia
 †Dufrenoyia justinae
 †Dufrenoyia rebeccae
 †Durania

E

 †Echinocorys
 †Echinocorys texanus
 †Ecoacteon
 †Ecoacteon linteus
 †Ecphora
 †Ecphora proquadricostata
  †Ectenosaurus
  †Edmontonia – or unidentified comparable form
 †Elea – tentative report
 †Elephantaria
 †Elephantaria simondsi – type locality for species
 †Ellipsoscapha
 †Ellipsoscapha mortoni
 †Ellipsoscapha striatella
  †Enchodus
 †Endoplocytia
 †Endoptygma
 †Endoptygma leprosa
 †Endostoma
 †Endostoma mexicana – or unidentified comparable form
 †Engonoceras
 †Engonoceras complicatum
 †Engonoceras elegans
 †Engonoceras gibbosum
 †Engonoceras hilli
 †Engonoceras retardum
 †Engonoceras serpentinum
 †Engonoceras stolleyi
 †Engonoceras subjectum – or unidentified related form
 †Enoploclytia
 †Enoploclytia triglypta
 †Enoploclytia wintoni
 †Entolium
 †Eoacteon
 †Eodouvilleiceras
 †Eomunidopsis
 †Eomunidopsis limonitica
 Eonavicula
 †Eonavicula newspecies1
 †Eonavicula rostellata
 †Eoradiolites
 †Eoradiolites davidsoni
 †Eosiderastrea
 †Eosiderastrea cuyleri – type locality for species
 †Eoursivivas
 †Eoursivivas harveyi
 †Epiaster
 †Epiaster whitei
 †Epiphaxum
 †Epiphaxum labyrinthicum – type locality for species
 †Episcoposaurus – type locality for genus
 †Episcoposaurus haplocerus – type locality for species
 †Epistomina
 †Epistomina charlottae
 †Epistomina lacunosa
 †Epistreptophyllum
 †Epistreptophyllum boesei – type locality for species
 †Epistreptophyllum budaensis – type locality for species
 †Epistreptophyllum shumardi – type locality for species
  †Epitonium
 †Epitonium sillimani
 †Etea
 †Etea corsicana
 †Etea peasi
 †Ethmocardium
 †Ethmocardium welleri
 †Eubaculites
 †Eubaculites carinatus
  †Eubostrychoceras
 †Eubostrychoceras reevesi
  †Eucalycoceras
 †Eucalycoceras templetonense – type locality for species
 †Eufistulana
 †Eufistulana ripleyana
 †Eufistulina
 †Eufistulina ripleyana
 †Eugyra
 †Eugyra cuyleri – type locality for species
 †Euhoplites – tentative report
  †Eulima
 †Eulima clara
 †Eulima laevigata
 †Euomphaloceras
 †Euomphaloceras alvaradoense
 †Euomphaloceras lonsdalei
 †Euomphaloceras septemseriatum
  †Eupachydiscus
 †Eupachydiscus grossouvrei
  †Euspira
 †Euspira dorothiensis
 †Euspira dorothiensis pendula
 †Euspira rectilabrum
 †Euspira rectilabrum texanus
 †Euspira rivulana
 Euthriofusus – or unidentified related form
 †Euthriofusus convexus
  †Eutrephoceras
 †Eutrephoceras dekayi
 †Eutrephoceras perlatus
 †Eutrephoceras planoventer
 †Ewingia – type locality for genus
 †Ewingia problematica – type locality for species
  †Exogyra
 †Exogyra americana
 †Exogyra arientina
 †Exogyra cancellata
 †Exogyra columbella
 †Exogyra columbella levis
 †Exogyra costata
 †Exogyra costata spinifera
 †Exogyra erraticostata
 †Exogyra potosina
 †Exogyra spinifera
 †Exogyra texana

F

  †Fagesia
 †Fagesia catinus
 †Faraudiella
 †Faraudiella franciscoensis
 †Faraudiella roermeri
 †Faujasia
 †Faujasia chelonium – type locality for species
   †Favia
 †Favia texana
 †Feldmannia
 †Feldmannia wintoni
 †Ficheuria
 †Ficheuria pernoni – or unidentified related form
 †Fictoacteon
 †Fictoacteon alveolanus
 †Fictoacteon humilispira
 †Fictoacteon imlayi
 †Fictoacteon saxanus
 Filisparsa
 †Flaventia
 †Flaventia ludana
 †Flemingostrea
 †Flemingostrea pratti
 †Flemingostrea subspatula
 †Flemingostrea subspatulata
 †Flexomornis – type locality for genus
 †Flexomornis howei – type locality for species
 †Flickia
 †Flickia simplex – type locality for species
 †Fomalhautia – type locality for genus
 †Fomalhautia hortensae – type locality for species
 †Forbesiceras
 †Forbesiceras beaumontianum
 †Forbesiceras brundrettei
 †Forbesiceras conlini
 †Forresteria
 †Forresteria castellense – type locality for species
 †Forresteria forresteri – type locality for species
 †Forresteria sevierense – type locality for species
 †Frenelopsis
 †Frenelopsis ramosissima
 †Fulgerca
 †Fulgerca attenuata – or unidentified related form
 †Fulgerca venusta
 †Fulpia
 †Fulpia pinguis
 †Fungella
 †Fuscinapedis – type locality for genus
 †Fuscinapedis woodbinensis – type locality for species
 †Fusimilis
 †Fusimilis robustus
   Fusinus
 †Fusinus cornelianus
 †Fusinus macnairyensis – or unidentified related form

G

  Galeorhinus
 †Galeorhinus girardoti – or unidentified related form
 †Gallolestes
 †Gallolestes agujaensis – type locality for species
 †Garramites
 †Garramites nitidus
  Gastrochaena
 Gaudryina
 †Gaudryina austinana
 †Gaudryina cushmani
 †Gaudryina ellisorae
 Gegania
 †Gegania manzaneti
 †Geltena
 †Geltena nitida
 †Geltena obesa
 †Geltena prunoides
 †Geltena subcompressa
 †Geltena subequilatera
 †Geltena sybcompressa
 †Gerdalia
  †Gervillia
 †Gervillia bryani
 †Gervillia wellsi – tentative report
 †Gervilliopsis
 †Gervilliopsis ensiformis
 †Gervilliopsis ensiformis extensa
 †Gervilliopsis invaginata
  Ginglymostoma
 †Glenrosa
 †Glenrosa pagiophylloides
 †Glenrosa texensis
 †Globator
 †Globator vaughani – type locality for species
   †Globidens
 †Globidens dakotensis
  Globigerina
 †Globigerina cretacea
 †Globigerina washitaensis
 Glossus
 †Glossus bulbosa
 †Glossus hendersoni
 †Glossus irelandi
 †Glossus shumardi
 †Glossus slatana
 †Glossus slatana parva
  Glycymeris
 †Glycymeris rotundata
 †Glycymeris rotundata kaufmanensis
  †Glyptops – tentative report
 †Glyptoxoceras
 †Glyptoxoceras texanum
 †Gobiates
 †Goniochasma
 †Goniochasma scaphoides
 †Goniocylichna
 †Goniophorus
 †Goniophorus scotti
 †Graciliala
 †Graciliala calcaris
 †Graciliala cooki
 †Graciliala johnsoni – tentative report
 †Grammatodon
 †Grammatodon adkinsi
 †Grammatodon bowiei
 †Granocardium
 †Granocardium bowenae
 †Granocardium conradi
 †Granocardium deltanum
 †Granocardium dumosum
 †Granocardium kuemmeli
 †Granocardium kummeli
 †Granocardium lowei
 †Granocardium rossae
 †Granocardium tholi
 †Granocardium tippananum
 †Graphidula
 †Graphidula gabrielensis – tentative report
 †Graphidula hoggi
 †Graphidula lynnensis
 †Graphidula multicostata
 †Graphidula terebriformis
 †Graptocarcinus
 †Graptocarcinus texanus
 †Graysonia
 †Graysonia bergquisti
 †Graysonites
 †Graysonites adkinsi
 †Graysonites wacoense
  †Gryphaea
 †Gryphaea aucella – or unidentified related form
 †Gryphaea gibberosa
 †Gryphaea marcoui
 †Gryphaea pitcheri
 †Gryphaea washitaensis
 †Gryphaeostrea
 †Gryphaeostrea vomer
  †Gryposaurus – tentative report
 †Gryposaurus alsatei
 †Guembelina
 †Guembelina globulosa
 †Guembelina paucistriata
 †Gumbelina
 †Gymnentome
 †Gymnentome valida
 †Gymnentome valida brevis
 †Gypsichnites
 †Gypsichnites titanopelopatidus
 Gyrodes
 †Gyrodes abyssinus
 †Gyrodes americanus
 †Gyrodes major
 †Gyrodes petrosus
 †Gyrodes rotundus
 †Gyrodes spillmani
 †Gyrodes subcarinatus
 †Gyrodes supraplicatus
 †Gyrodes tramitensis
 †Gyronchus
 †Gyronchus dumblei
 †Gyrostrea
 †Gyrostrea cortex

H

  Haminoea – tentative report
 †Haminoea simpsonensis
 †Hamites
 †Hamrabatis
 †Hamrabatis weltoni – type locality for species
 †Hamulus
 †Hamulus huntensis
 †Hamulus onyx
 †Hamulus squamosus
 †Haplostiche
 †Haplostiche texana
 †Haplovoluta
 †Haplovoluta bicarinata
 †Harduinia
 †Harduinia bexari
 †Harduinia dalli
 †Harduinia mortonis
 †Helicoceras
 †Helicoceras navarroense
 †Helopanoplia
 Hemiaster
 †Hemiaster benhurensis
 †Hemiaster bexari
 †Hemiaster jacksoni
 †Hemiaster sabinal – type locality for species
 †Hemiaster texanus
 †Hemiaster wetherbyi
 †Hemicalypterus – tentative report
 †Hemicalypterus weiri
 Hemicerithium
 †Hemicerithium insigne
 †Hemicerithium interlineatum
 †Hercorhynchus
 †Hercorhynchus malleiformis
 †Hercorhyncus
 †Hercorhyncus coronale
 †Hercorhyncus malleiformis
 †Hercorhyncus mundum
 †Hercorhyncus nodosum
 †Hercorhyncus tippanus
 †Hercorhyncus vadosum
 †Heterocoenia – tentative report
 †Heterocoenia hilli – type locality for species
 †Heterocoenia washitaensis – type locality for species
  Heterodontus
 †Heterodontus granti – type locality for species
 † Heteromorpha
 †Heteromorpha ammonite
  Hexanchus
 †Hillites
 †Hillites multilirae
 †Hillites septarianus
 †Hindeastraea
 †Hindeastraea discoidea
 †Holaster
 †Holaster simplex
 †Holoclemensia – type locality for genus
 †Holoclemensia texana – type locality for species
   Homarus
 †Homarus brittonetris
 †Homarus davisi
 †Homarus travisensis
 †Homoeosolen
 †Homomya
 †Homomya thrusheri – tentative report
 †Hoplochelys
  †Hoploscaphites
 †Hoploscaphites pumilis
 †Huetamia
 †Huetamia buitronae
  --> †Hybodus
 †Hybodus brevicostatus – or unidentified comparable form
 †Hybodus butleri – type locality for species
  †Hydnophora – tentative report
 †Hydnophora styriaca – type locality for species
 †Hydrotribulus
 †Hydrotribulus asper
 †Hylaeobatis – or unidentified comparable form
 †Hylaeobatis ornata
 †Hypacanthoplites
 †Hypacanthoplites bakeri
 †Hypacanthoplites chihuahuaensis
 †Hypacanthoplites cragini
 †Hypacanthoplites quitmanensis
 †Hypacanthoplites rugosus
 †Hypacanthoplites sellardsi
 †Hypacanthoplites umbilicostatus
 †Hypolophus
 †Hypolophus mcnultyi – type locality for species
 †Hypophylloceras
 †Hypophylloceras tanit – or unidentified comparable form
 †Hypoturrilites
 †Hypoturrilites youngi

I

  †Ichthyodectes
  †Ichthyornis
 †Ichthyornis dispar
  †Idoceras
 †Idoceras clarki
 †Idoceras schucherti
 †Iguanodon – or unidentified comparable form
  †Inoceramus
 †Inoceramus anomalus – or unidentified comparable form
 †Inoceramus arnoldi
 †Inoceramus arvanus
 †Inoceramus balticus
 †Inoceramus biconstrictus
 †Inoceramus cordiformis – or unidentified comparable form
 †Inoceramus cummingsi
 †Inoceramus deformis
 †Inoceramus dimidius
 †Inoceramus eulessanus
 †Inoceramus fragilis
 †Inoceramus prefragilis
 †Inoceramus vanuxemi – tentative report
 †Irenesauripus
 †Irenesauripus glenrosensis
  †Isastrea
 †Isastrea whitneyi – type locality for species
 †Ischyrhiza
 †Ischyrhiza avonicola
 †Ischyrhiza mira
 †Ischyrhiza monasterica – type locality for species
 †Isomicraster
 †Isomicraster danei
 †Isomicraster rossi – type locality for species

J

  †Jeletzkytes
 †Jeletzkytes brevis
 Juliacorbula
 †Juliacorbula linteroidea
 †Juliacorbula monmouthensis

K

 †Kamerunoceras
 †Kamerunoceras calvertense
 †Kamerunoceras eschii – or unidentified comparable form
 †Kasanskyella
 †Kasanskyella cuchillensis – tentative report
 †Kasanskyella fosteri
 †Kasanskyella spathi
 †Kasanskyella whitneyi – tentative report
 †Kazanskyella
 †Kazanskyella cuchillense
 †Kazanskyella fosteri
 †Kazanskyella minima
 †Kazanskyella trinitensis
 †Kazanskyella whitneyi
 †Kermackia – type locality for genus
 †Kermackia texana – type locality for species
 †Kimbleia
 †Kimbleia albrittoni
 †Kimbleia capacis
   †Koskinonodon – type locality for genus
 †Koskinonodon perfectus – type locality for species
  †Kritosaurus

L

 †Laevigyra
 †Laevigyra dhondtae
 †Lamellaerhynchia
 †Lamellaerhynchia indi – type locality for species
 †Lamellaerhynchia viae – type locality for species
  Lamna
 †Lamna sulcata – or unidentified related form
 †Lanieria
 †Lanieria uvaldana – type locality for species
 †Lasalichthys
 †Lasalichthys hillsi
 Laternula
 †Laternula bartoni
 †Laternula johnsonana
 †Laternula robusta
 †Laternula sublevis
 †Laternula sulcatina
 †Laternula tofana
 †Laternula virgata
 †Latiala
 †Latiala lobata
 †Latiastrea
 †Latiastrea whitneyi
  Latiaxis
 †Latiscopus – type locality for genus
 †Latiscopus disjunctus – type locality for species
 †Laxispira
 †Laxispira lumbricalis
 †Laxispira monilifera
 †Legumen
 †Legumen ellipticum
 †Legumen ligula
 Lenticulina
 †Lenticulina cyprina
 †Lenticulina gaultina
   †Lepidotes
  Lepisosteus
 †Leptarbacia
 †Leptarbacia argutus
 Leptomaria
 †Leptomaria austinensis
 †Leptomaria robusta
 
 †Leptorhynchos – type locality for genus
 †Leptorhynchos gaddisi – type locality for species
 †Leptosolen
 †Leptosolen angustus
 †Leptosolen biplicata
 †Leptosolen levis
 †Leptosolen linguliformis
 †Leptosolen quadrilaterus
 †Leptosolen quadriliratus
 †Leptostyrax
 †Leptostyrax bicuspidatus
 †Leptostyrax macrorhiza
  †Leptosuchus
 †Leptosuchus crosbiensis – type locality for species
 †Leptosuchus imperfecta – type locality for species
 †Leptosuchus studeri – type locality for species
 †Levicerithium
 †Levicerithium altum
 †Levicerithium basicostae
 †Levicerithium breviforme
 †Levicerithium microlirae – tentative report
 †Levicerithium planum
 †Levicerithium timberanum
  †Lewesiceras
 †Lewyites
 †Lewyites clinensis
  †Leyvachelys
 †Leyvachelys cipadi
 †Libognathus – type locality for genus
 †Libognathus sheddi – type locality for species
  †Libonectes
 †Libonectes morgani – type locality for species
 Lima
 †Lima acutilineata texana
 †Lima coahuilensis
 †Lima cokei
 †Lima deatsvillensis
 †Lima generosa
 †Lima geronimioensis
 †Lima geronimoensis
 †Lima guadalupensis
 †Lima pelagica
 †Lima wacoensis
 Limatula
 †Limatula acutilineata
 Limea
 †Limea reticulata
 Limopsis
 †Limopsis meeki
 †Linearia
 †Linearia crebelli
 †Linearis
 †Linearis concentrica
 †Linearis metastriata
 †Linearis navarroana
 †Linearis pectinis
 †Linearis wieserae
 Lingula
 †Lingula subspatulata
 †Linter
 †Linter acutata
 †Linthia
 †Linthia variabilis
  Linuparus
 †Linuparus adkinsi
 †Linuparus grimmeri
 †Linuparus watkinsi
 †Lioestheria – tentative report
 †Liopeplum
 †Liopeplum cretaceum
 †Liopeplum eiodermum
 †Liopeplum leioderma
 †Liopeplum leioderma breve
 †Liopeplum leioderma longum
 †Liopeplum leioderma tabulatum
 †Liopeplum rugosum
 †Liopistha
 †Liopistha alternata
 †Liopistha formosa
 †Liopistha protexta
 †Liothyris
 †Liothyris carolinensis – or unidentified comparable form
 †Liothyris navarroana
 Liquidambar – tentative report
 †Lirosoma
 †Lirosoma cretacea
 †Lispodesthes
 †Lispodesthes lirata
 †Lispodesthes panda
 †Lispodesthes patula
  †Lissodus
 †Lissodus babulski – or unidentified related form
  †Lithacoceras
 †Lithacoceras malonianum
  Lithophaga
 †Lomirosa
 †Lomirosa cretacea
 †Lonchidion
 †Lonchidion anitae – type locality for species
 †Lonchidion humblei – type locality for species
 †Lonchidion selachos
 †Longoconcha
 †Longoconcha dalli
 †Longoconcha navarroensis
   †Longosuchus
 †Longosuchus meadei – type locality for species
 †Longosuchus meadi
  Lopha
 †Lopha falcata
 †Lopha mesenterica
 †Lopha subovata
 †Loriolia
 †Loriolia rosana
 †Lowenstamia
 †Lowenstamia subplanus – or unidentified comparable form
 †Loxostomoides
 †Loxostomoides cushmani
 †Lucasuchus – type locality for genus
 †Lucasuchus hunti – type locality for species
 Lucina
 †Lucina aspera
 †Lucina chatfieldana
 †Lucina dentonana
 †Lucina glebula
 †Lucina oleodorsum
 †Lucina potosina
 †Lucina seminolis
 †Luisogalathea
 †Luisogalathea cretacea
 †Lupira
 †Lupira pyriformis
 †Lutema
 †Lutema geniculata
 †Lutema hubbardi
 †Lutema munda
 †Lutema simpsonensis
 †Lycettia
 †Lycettia tippana
 †Lycettia tippanus
 †Lyriochlamys – tentative report

M

 †Macraster
 †Macraster arguilera
 †Macraster elegans
 †Macraster nodopyda
 †Macrepistius
 †Macrocerithium
 †Macrocerithium tramitense
 †Macromesodon
 †Macromesodon dumblei
 †Magadiceramus
 †Magadiceramus complicatus
 †Magadiceramus crenelatus
 †Magadiceramus crenistriatus – or unidentified comparable form
 †Magadiceramus subquadratus
 †Magnoavipes – type locality for genus
 †Magnoavipes lowei – type locality for species
  †Malerisaurus
 Malletia
 †Malletia littlei
 †Malletia longfrons
 †Malletia longifrons
 †Malletia stephensoni
  †Mammites
 †Mammites powelli – type locality for species
  †Mantelliceras
 †Mantelliceras cantianum
 †Mantelliceras martimpreyi – or unidentified comparable form
 †Mantelliceras saxbii
 †Margaritella
 †Margaritella pumila
  †Mariella
 †Mariella bosquensis
 †Mariella brazoensis
 †Mariella camachoensis
 †Mariella cenomanensis – or unidentified comparable form
 †Mariella davisense
 †Mariella rhacioformis
 †Mariella wysogorskii
 †Mataxa
 †Mataxa subteres
 †Mataxa valida
 †Mataxa valida multilirae
 †Mathilda
 †Mathilda cedarensis
 †Mathilda corona
 †Meandraraea
 †Meandraraea plummeri – type locality for species
 †Meandraraea tulae – or unidentified comparable form
 †Medionapus
 †Medionapus elongatus
 Megalomphalus – or unidentified comparable form
 †Megalosauropus – tentative report
 †Megalosauropus titanopelobatidus – type locality for species
 Melanatria
 †Melanatria venusta
 †Melicertites
  Membranipora
 Membraniporidra
 †Menabites
 †Menabites austinensis
 †Menabites danei
 †Menabites delawarensis
 †Menabites vanuxemi
  †Meniscoessus
  †Menuites
  Mesalia
 †Mesalia shumardi
 †Mesodma
 †Mesomorpha
 †Mesomorpha excavata
 †Mesomorpha vaughani – type locality for species
 †Metengonoceras
 †Metengonoceras acutum
 †Metengonoceras ambiguum
 †Metengonoceras bravoense
 †Metengonoceras dumbli
 †Metengonoceras inscriptum
 †Metoicoceras
 †Metoicoceras crassicostae
 †Metoicoceras geslinianum
 †Metoicoceras latoventer
 †Metoicoceras swallovi
 †Metoicoceras swallovii
 †Metoicoceras swallovii macrum
  †Metoposaurus
 †Metoposaurus bakeri – type locality for species
 †Metoposaurus fraasi
 †Metoposaurus jonesi – type locality for species
 †Metoposaurus perfecta
 †Mexicaprina
 †Mexicaprina cornuta
 †Micrabacia
 †Micrabacia marylandica
 †Micrabacia radiata – type locality for species
  †Micraster
 †Micraster americanus
 †Micraster uddeni – type locality for species
 †Microsolena
 †Microsolena texana – type locality for species
 †Microsulcatoceras
 †Microsulcatoceras texanum – type locality for species
 †Miocardiopsis
 †Miocardiopsis hendersoni
 †Miocardiopsis shumardi
  †Modiolus
 †Modiolus sedesclaris
 †Modiolus sedesclarus
 †Modiolus sedisclarus
  Monodonta – tentative report
 †Monodonta cancellosa
 †Monopleura – tentative report
 †Monroea
 †Monroea castellana
 Montastraea
 †Montastraea comalensis
 †Montastraea edwardsensis – type locality for species
 †Montastraea pecosensis – type locality for species
 †Montastraea roemeriana – type locality for species
 †Montastraea texana
 †Montastraea travisensis
 †Montastraea whitneyi
 †Morea
 †Morea cancellaria
 †Morea cancellaria corsicanensis
 †Morea cancellaria crassa
 †Morea marylandica
 †Morea marylandica bella
 †Morea marylandica languida
 †Morea transenna
 †Moremanoceras
 †Moremanoceras elgini
 †Moremanoceras flexuosum – type locality for species
 †Morphastrea
 †Morphastrea barcenai – or unidentified comparable form
  †Mortoniceras
 †Mortoniceras austinensis
 †Mortoniceras drakei
 †Mortoniceras maxima
 †Mortoniceras minima
 †Mortoniceras perinflatum
 †Mortoniceras rostratum
 †Mortoniceras wintoni
  †Mosasaurus
 †Mosasaurus maximus
 †Mosasaurus missouriensis – tentative report
 †Muensterella
 †Muensterella jillae – type locality for species
 †Myobarbum
 †Myobarbum laevigatum
 †Myriophyllia – tentative report
 †Myriophyllia dumblei – type locality for species
 Myrtea
 †Myrtea stephensoni
 †Mytiloides
 †Mytiloides columbianus
  †Mytilus

N

 †Naomichelys
 †Napulus
 †Napulus octoliratus
 †Napulus tuberculatus
  Natica
 †Natica dorothiensis
 †Natica humilis
 †Natica rivulana
 †Natica striaticostata
  Nebrius
 †Neithea
 †Neithea bexarensis
 †Neithea quinquecostata
 †Nelltia
 †Nelltia stenzeli
 †Nemocardium
 †Nemocardium fragile
 †Nemocardium guadalupense
 †Nemocardium marcosensis
 †Nemocardium tenue
 †Nemodon
 †Nemodon adkinsi
 †Nemodon bowiei
 †Nemodon eufalensis
 †Nemodon eufaulensis
 †Nemodon eufaulensis lineatus
 †Nemodon grandis
 †Nemodon grandis navarroanus
 †Nemodon martindalensis
 †Nemodon navarroanus
 †Nemodon punctus
 †Neobrites
 †Neobrites nodocostatus
 †Neocardioceras
 †Neocardioceras juddii
 †Neodeshayesites
 †Neodeshayesites comalensis
 †Neodeshayesites mayfieldensis
 †Neogauthiericeras
 †Neogauthiericeras zafimahovai
  †Neohibolites
 †Neophlycticeras
 †Neophlycticeras archerae – type locality for species
 †Neophlycticeras blancheti – or unidentified comparable form
 †Neophlycticeras fascicostatum – type locality for species
 †Neophlycticeras roemeri
 †Neophlycticeras texanum
 †Neoptychites
  †Nerinea – tentative report
  Nerita
 †Nerita ornata
 †Nerita semilevis
  Neritina
 †Neritina ambrosana
 †Neritina insolita
 Nodosaria
 †Nodosaria barkeri
 †Nonactaeonina
 †Nonactaeonina deflexa
 †Nonactaeonina graphoides
 †Nonactaeonina tensa
 †Nonactaeonina triticea
 †Nonaphalagodus – type locality for genus
 †Nonaphalagodus trinitiensis – type locality for species
  †Nostoceras
 †Nostoceras approximans
 †Nostoceras colubriformis
 †Nostoceras draconsis
 †Nostoceras helicinum crassum
 †Nostoceras helicinum humile
 †Nostoceras helicinus
 †Nostoceras hyatti
 †Nostoceras splendidum
 †Nostoceras stantoni aberrans
 †Nostoceras stantoni prematurum
 †Notodonax
 †Notopoides – tentative report
 †Notopoides pflugervillensis – type locality for species
 †Nucleopygus
 †Nucleopygus texanus
  Nucula
 †Nucula camia
 †Nucula chatfieldensis
 †Nucula chatsfieldensis
 †Nucula ciboloensis
 †Nucula cuneifrons
 †Nucula microstriata
 †Nucula nacatochana
 †Nucula percrassa
 †Nucula perequalis
 †Nucula rivulana
 †Nucula stantoni
 †Nucula waltonensis
 Nuculana
 †Nuculana coloradoensis
 †Nuculana corbetensis
 †Nuculana corsicana
 †Nuculana houstoni
 †Nuculana mutuata
 †Nuculana protexta
 †Nuculana rostratruncata
 †Nuculana travisana
 †Nuculana whitfieldi
 †Nudivagus – tentative report
 †Nymphalucina
 †Nymphalucina linearia
 †Nymphalucina parva
 †Nyssa

O

 †Odaxosaurus
 †Odaxosaurus piger
  Odontaspis
 †Odontaspis aculeatus
 †Ogilviastraea – tentative report
 †Ogilviastraea richardsi – type locality for species
 †Oklatheridium
 †Oklatheridium minax
 †Oklatheridium szalayi
 †Oligoptycha
 †Oligoptycha americana – tentative report
  †Onchopristis
 †Onchopristis dunklei
  †Onchosaurus
 †Opertochasma
 †Opertochasma scaphoides
 †Opertochasma subconicum
 †Opertochasma venustum
  †Ophiomorpha
  †Ophiopsis – tentative report
 Ophiura
 †Ophiura graysonensis
 †Ophiura texana
 †Ophiura travisana – type locality for species
 †Opis
 †Opis elevata – tentative report
  †Ornithomimus
 †Ornopsis
 †Ornopsis digressa
 †Ornopsis maxeyi
 †Ornopsis pulchra
 †Ornopsis solistella
  †Ostlingoceras
 †Ostlingoceras brandi
  Ostrea
 †Ostrea alternans
 †Ostrea bella
 †Ostrea beloiti
 †Ostrea carica
 †Ostrea carinata – or unidentified related form
 †Ostrea crenulimargo
 †Ostrea leveretti
 †Ostrea lugubris
 †Ostrea owenana
 †Ostrea panda
 †Ostrea rubradiata
 †Ostrea soleniscus
 †Ostrea subovata
 †Ostrea subradiata
 †Otischalkia – type locality for genus
 †Otischalkia elderae – type locality for species
 †Ovalastrea – type locality for genus
 †Ovalastrea fredericksburgensis – type locality for species
 †Ovalastrea pecosensis – type locality for species
 †Oxyrhina
 †Oxyrhina extenta
 †Oxytropidoceras
 †Oxytropidoceras acuticarinatum
 †Oxytropidoceras acutocarinatum
 †Oxytropidoceras bravoensis
 †Oxytropidoceras carbonarium
 †Oxytropidoceras diazi
 †Oxytropidoceras moorei
 †Oxytropidoceras multifidum
 †Oxytropidoceras pandalense – or unidentified comparable form
 †Oxytropidoceras powelli
 †Oxytropidoceras salasi
 †Oxytropidoceras stenzeli
 †Oxytropidoceras supani
 †Oxytropidoceras texanum
 †Oxytropidoceras uddeni

P

 †Pachycheilosuchus – type locality for genus
 †Pachycheilosuchus trinquei – type locality for species
  †Pachydesmoceras
  †Pachydiscus
 †Pachydiscus arkansanus
 †Pachydiscus paulsoni
 †Pachydiscus scotti
 †Pachydiscus travisi
  †Pachygenelus
 †Pachygenelus milleri – type locality for species
  †Pachymelania
 †Pachymya
  Pagurus
 †Pagurus travisensis
 †Paladmete
 †Paladmete alta
 †Paladmete cancellaria
 †Paladmete cancelleria
 †Paladmete corbuliformis
 †Paladmete elegans
 †Paladmete gardnerae
 †Paladmete inequalis
  †Palaeobalistum
 †Palaeobalistum geiseri – type locality for species
 †Palaeobalistum rectidens – type locality for species
 †Palaeoctonus
 †Palaeoctonus dumblianus – type locality for species
 †Palaeoctonus orthodon – type locality for species
 †Palaeocypraea
 †Palaeocypraea corsicanana
 †Palaeocypraea nuciformis
 †Palaeogaleus
 †Palaeogaleus navarroensis – type locality for species
 †Paleollanosaurus – type locality for genus
 †Paleollanosaurus fraseri – type locality for species
 †Paleomolops
 †Paleomolops langstoni – type locality for species
 †Paleopsephaea
 †Paleopsephaea decorosa
 †Paleopsephaea patens
 †Paleopsephaea sinuosa
 †Paleopsephaea vadoana
  †Paleorhinus
 †Paleorhinus sawini – type locality for species
 †Paluxysuchus – type locality for genus
 †Paluxysuchus newmani – type locality for species
 †Panis
 †Panis cuneiformis
 Panopea
 †Panopea anacachoensis – type locality for species
 †Panopea subplicata
 †Pantojaloria
 †Pantojaloria sphaerica
 †Pappotherium – type locality for genus
 †Pappotherium pattersoni – type locality for species
 †Paracimexomys
 Paracyprideis
 †Paracyprideis graysonensis
 Paracypris
 †Paracypris alta
 †Parafusus – tentative report
 †Parahoplites
 †Parahoplites thomasi
 †Parahoplites wintoni
 †Paraisurus
 †Paraisurus compressus
 †Paramicrodon – type locality for genus
 †Paramicrodon estesi – type locality for species
 †Parandiceras
 †Parandiceras indicum – or unidentified comparable form
 †Paranecrocarcinus
 †Paranecrocarcinus moseleyi
 †Paranecrocarinus
 †Paranecrocarinus ovalis
 †Paranomia
 †Paranomia scabra
  †Parapuzosia
 †Parapuzosia americana – type locality for species
 †Parapuzosia bosei – type locality for species
 †Parapuzosia sealei – type locality for species
 †Parasaniwa – or unidentified comparable form
 †Parasaniwa wyomingensis
 Parasmilia
 †Parasmilia austinensis
 †Parasmilia bullardi – type locality for species
 †Parasmilia graysonensis – type locality for species
 †Parasuchus
 †Parasuchus bransoni
  †Paratypothorax
 †Paraxiopsis
 †Paraxiopsis erugatus
 †Parengonoceras
 †Parengonoceras roemeri
 †Parmicorbula
 †Parmicorbula corneliana
 †Parmicorbula hillensis
 †Parmicorbula numerosa
 †Parmicorbula rupana
 †Parmicorbula sinuosa
 †Parmicorbula suffalciata
 †Parmicorbula terramaria
 †Parmicorbula vokesi
  †Paronychodon
 †Paronychodon lacustris – or unidentified comparable form
 Parvamussium
 †Parvamussium danei
 †Parvivoluta – tentative report
 Patellina
 †Patellina subcretacea
  †Pawpawsaurus – type locality for genus
 †Pawpawsaurus campbelli – type locality for species
  †Pecten
 †Pecten bellula
 †Pecten bellulus
 †Pecten catherina
 †Pecten georgetownensis
 †Pecten moodyi
 †Pecten subalpinus
 †Pecten texanus
 †Pecten venustus
 †Pecten wrighti
 †Pedinopsis
 †Pedinopsis pondi
 †Peilinia
 †Peilinia quadriplicata
 †Pekinosaurus – or unidentified related form
 †Pekinosaurus olseni
 †Peneteius
 Periploma
 †Periploma edwardsi
 †Periplomya
 †Periplomya sulcatina
 Perna – report made of unidentified related form or using admittedly obsolete nomenclature
 †Perna texana
 †Perrisonota
 †Perrisonota littlei
 †Perrisonota protexta
 Petrophyllia
 †Phacellocoenia – tentative report
 †Phacellocoenia tolmachoffana – type locality for species
 Phacoides
 †Phacoides mattiformis
 †Pharodina
 †Pharodina ferrana
 †Phelopteria
 †Phelopteria dalli
 †Phelopteria linguaeformis
 †Phelopteria timberensis
 Pholadidea
 †Pholadidea ragsdalensis
  Pholadomya
 †Pholadomya coahuilensis
 †Pholadomya goldenensis
 †Pholadomya ingens
 †Pholadomya littlei
 †Pholadomya occidentalis
 †Pholadomya shattucki
  Pholas
 †Pholas scaphoides
 †Phyllobrissus
 †Phyllobrissus cubensis
  †Phymosoma
 †Phymosoma hilli
 †Phytosaurus
 †Piestochilus
 †Piestochilus curviliratus
 †Piestochilus levis
 †Pinella
 †Pinella reticulata
  †Pinna
 †Pinna laqueata
 †Pirsila
 †Pirsila decora
 †Pirsila simpla
 †Pirsila tensa
  Pitar
 †Pitar yoakumi
  †Placenticeras
 †Placenticeras interealare
 †Placenticeras meeki
 †Placenticeras syrtale
 Placopsilina
 †Placopsilina minima
 †Placotrochus
 †Placotrochus texanus
 Plagioecia
 †Planocephalosaurus
 †Planocephalosaurus lucasi – type locality for species
 Planulina
 †Planulina eaglefordensis
  †Platecarpus
 †Platecarpus planifrons
 †Platecarpus somenensis – or unidentified comparable form
 †Platecarpus tympaniticus
 †Platiknemiceras
 †Platiknemiceras flexuosum
  †Platyceramus
 †Platyceramus cycloides
 †Platyceramus mantelli - or unidentified loosely related form
  †Platypterygius
 †Plesiacanthoceras
 †Plesiacanthoceras bellsanum
 †Plesiosaurus
 †Pleuriocardia
 †Pleuriocardia eufaulense
 †Pleuriocardia eufaulensis huntanum
 †Pleurocora
 †Pleurocora coalescens
 †Pleuromya
 †Pleuromya inconstans
 †Pleurosmilia
 †Pleurosmilia quaylei – type locality for species
 †Pleurosmilia saxifisi – type locality for species
  Pleurotomaria
 †Pleurotomaria macilenta
 †Plicatolamna – or unidentified comparable form
 †Plicatolamna arcuata
 †Plicatoscyllium – type locality for genus
 †Plicatoscyllium antiquum – type locality for species
 †Plicatoscyllium derameei – type locality for species
 Plicatula
 †Plicatula clarki
 †Plicatula dentonensis
 †Plicatula goldenana
 †Plicatula incongrua
 †Plicatula mullicaensis
 †Plicatula tetrica
 †Plioaxius
 †Plioaxius texensis
  †Plioplatecarpus – tentative report
 †Poecilocrinus
 †Poecilocrinus dispandus
    Polinices
 †Polinices kummeli
 †Polinices stephensoni
 †Pollex
 †Pollex angulatus
 †Pollex obesus
 †Polyacrodus
 †Polyacrodus parvidens – or unidentified related form
  †Polyptychodon
 †Polyptychodon hudsoni – type locality for species
 †Polytremacis
 †Polytremacis hancockensis – type locality for species
 †Polytremacis urgonensis
 †Pontocyprella
 †Pontocyprella alexanderi
  †Poposaurus
 †Poposaurus gracilis
 †Poposaurus langstoni
 †Porituberoolithus
 †Postligata
  †Postosuchus – type locality for genus
 †Postosuchus kirkpatricki – type locality for species
 †Praeleda
 †Praeleda compar
 †Prionocyclites
 †Prionocyclites mite
 †Prionocyclus
 †Prionocyclus albinus
 †Prionocyclus hyatti
 †Prionocyclus macombi
 †Prionocyclus wyomingensis
 †Priontropis
 †Priontropis woolgari – or unidentified related form
 †Priscomactra
 †Priscomactra cymba
 †Priscomactra munda
 †Procardia
 †Procardia torta
 †Procheloniceras
 †Procheloniceras albrechtiaustriae – or unidentified related form
  †Prognathodon – tentative report
 †Promystriosuchus – type locality for genus
 †Promystriosuchus ehleri – type locality for species
 †Proraster
 †Proraster dalli
 †Proscincetes
 †Proscincetes texanus
 †Prosiren – type locality for genus
 †Prosiren elinorae – type locality for species
 †Protarca
 †Protarca tramitensis
 †Protecovasaurus – type locality for genus
 †Protecovasaurus lucasi – type locality for species
 †Protexanites
 †Protexanites planatus
 †Protoavis – type locality for genus
 †Protoavis texensis – type locality for species
 †Protocallianassa
 †Protocallianassa pleuralum – type locality for species
 †Protocardia
 †Protocardia guadalupense
 †Protocardia hillana
 †Protocardia marcosensis
 †Protocardia spillmani
 †Protocardia texana
 †Protocardia timberensis
 †Protocardia torta
 †Protocardia wadei
 †Protodonax
 †Protodonax lingulatus
 †Protodonax lingulatus tensus
 †Protodonax robustus
 †Protohadros – type locality for genus
 †Protohadros byrdi – type locality for species
 †Protoplatyrhina
 †Protoplatyrhina renae
  †Protosphyraena
 †Proxestops
 †Pseudananchys
 †Pseudananchys stephensoni – type locality for species
 †Pseudaspidoceras
 †Pseudaspidoceras flexuosum
 †Pseudocalycoceras
 †Pseudocalycoceras angolaense
 †Pseudoclavulina
 †Pseudoclavulina clavata
 †Pseudocoeniopsis – tentative report
 †Pseudocoeniopsis wintoni – type locality for species
  †Pseudocorax
 †Pseudocorax granti
 †Pseudogaudryinella
 †Pseudogaudryinella capitosa
 †Pseudohypolophus
 †Pseudolimea
 †Pseudolimea kimbroensis
 †Pseudolimea reticulata
 †Pseudolimea sellardsi
 Pseudomalaxis
 †Pseudomalaxis patens
 †Pseudomalaxis pateriformis
  †Pseudomelania
 †Pseudomelania basicostata
 †Pseudomelania ferrata
 †Pseudomelania roanokana
 †Pseudoncrocarcinus
 †Pseudoncrocarcinus scotti
 †Pseudoperna
 †Pseudoperna congesta
 †Pseudopetalodontia
 †Pseudopetalodontia felixi
 †Pseudoptera
 †Pseudoptera hornensis
 †Pseudoptera hornesis
 †Pseudoptera rushana
 †Pseudoptera serrata
 †Pseudoptera viana
 †Psilomya
 †Psilomya concentrica
 †Psilomya levis
  †Pteranodon – or unidentified comparable form
  †Pteria
 †Pteria linguaeformis – tentative report
 †Pteria rhombica
 †Pterocerella
 †Pterocerella densatus
 †Pterocerella densatus nacatochanus
 †Pterocerella poinsettiformis
 †Pterocerella robustus
 †Pterot
 †Pterot castrovillensis – or unidentified related form
  †Pterotrigonia
 †Pterotrigonia castrovillensis
 †Pterotrigonia eufalensis
 †Pterotrigonia eufaulensis
 †Pterotrigonia eufaulensis gabbi
 †Pterotrigonia marionensis
 †Pterotrigonia stantoni
 †Ptychomya
 †Ptychomya stantonii
 †Ptychotrygon
 †Ptychotrygon vermiculata
 †Ptychotrygon winni – type locality for species
 †Pugnellus
 †Pugnellus densatus
 †Pugnellus goldmani
  †Puzosia
 †Puzosia crebrisulcata – or unidentified comparable form
  Pycnodonte
 †Pycnodonte belli
 †Pycnodonte mutabilis
 †Pycnodonte vesicularis
 †Pycnomicrodon
 †Pycnomicrodon texanus
 †Pyrgulifera
 †Pyrgulifera costata
 †Pyrgulifera costata sublevis
 †Pyrgulifera costata tuberata
 †Pyrgulifera ornata
 †Pyrifusus
 †Pyrina
 †Pyrina parryi
 †Pyropsis
 †Pyropsis lanhami
 †Pyropsis proxima – or unidentified related form

Q

 †Quayia – or unidentified comparable form
 †Quayia zideki
  †Quetzalcoatlus – type locality for genus
 †Quetzalcoatlus northropi – type locality for species
 †Quitmaniceras
 †Quitmaniceras reaseri
 †Quitmanites
 †Quitmanites ceratitosus
 †Quitmanites evolutus

R

 †Rachiosoma
 †Rachiosoma hondoensis – type locality for species
 †Radiopecten
 †Radiopecten mississippiensis
 Raja
 †Raja farishi – type locality for species
 †Ramsetia
 †Ramsetia whitfieldi
 †Raninella
 †Remera
 †Remera decora
 †Remera juncea
 †Remera microstriata
 †Remnita
 †Remnita anomalocostata
 †Remnita biacuminata
 †Remondia
 †Remondia robbinsi
 Reophax
 †Reophax deckeri
 †Reptomulticava
 †Restes
 †Rewaconodon – or unidentified related form
 †Rewaconodon tikiensis
 †Rhamphidoceras – type locality for genus
 †Rhamphidoceras saxatilis – type locality for species
  Rhinobatos
 †Rhinobatos craddocki – type locality for species
 †Rhinobatos uvulatus – type locality for species
  †Rhombodus
 †Rhombodus binkhorsti
 †Rhytidohoplites
 †Rhytidohoplites robertsi
 †Rhytophorus – tentative report
  †Richardoestesia
 †Richardoestesia gilmorei
 †Richardoestesia isosceles – type locality for species
 †Rileymillerus – type locality for genus
 †Rileymillerus cosgriffi – type locality for species
  Ringicula
 †Ringicula anfractoline
 †Ringicula arlingtonensis
 †Ringicula culbertsoni
 †Ringicula pulchella
 †Ringicula sufflata
  Rogerella
 †Rogerella cragini – type locality for species
 †Romaniceras
 †Romaniceras aguilerai
 †Romaniceras zacatecana
 Rostellaria – tentative report
 †Rostellaria robertsi
 †Russellosaurus – type locality for genus
 †Russellosaurus coheni – type locality for species
  †Rutiodon

S

 Salenia
 †Salenia hondoensis – type locality for species
 †Sanmiguelia
 †Sanoarca
 †Sanoarca faucana
 †Sanoarca grandis
 †Sargana
 †Sargana stantoni
  †Sauroposeidon
 †Sauroposeidon proteles
  †Saurornitholestes
 †Saurornitholestes langstoni – or unidentified comparable form
 †Sauvagesia – tentative report
 †Sauvagesia hilli
 †Saynella
 †Saynella hilli
 Scalpellum – tentative report
 †Scambula
 †Scambula perplana
  †Scapanorhynchus
 †Scapanorhynchus texanus
 †Scapanorhynchus textanus
 †Scapherpeton
  †Scaphites
 †Scaphites bosquensis – type locality for species
 †Scaphites brittonensis
 †Scaphites hippocrepis - or unidentified loosely related form
 †Scaphites rugosus
 †Scaphites warreni
 †Scaphites yorkensis
 †Schizobasis
 Scintilla – tentative report
 †Scintilla ramoni
 †Sciponoceras
 †Sciponoceras gracile
  †Sclerorhynchus
 †Sclerorhynchus pettersi – type locality for species
 †Scolomastax – type locality for genus
 †Scolomastax sahlsteini – type locality for species
  Scyliorhinus
 †Scyliorhinus ivagrantae – type locality for species
  †Selaginella – or unidentified comparable form
 †Seminodicrescis
 †Seminola – tentative report
 †Semiometra
 †Semiometra minuta
  †Semionotus – or unidentified comparable form
 †Senis
 †Senis elongata
 †Senis elongatus
  Serpula
 †Serpula cretacea
 †Serpula implicata
 †Serpula lineata
  †Serratolamna
 †Serratolamna serrata
 †Sexta
 †Sexta ethelana
 †Sexta navicula
 †Sharpeiceras
 †Sharpeiceras schlueteri
 †Sharpeiceras tlahualiloense
 †Shuparoceras
  †Shuvosaurus – type locality for genus
 †Shuvosaurus inexpectatus – type locality for species
  †Siderastrea
 †Siderastrea tuckerae – type locality for species
 †Siderofungia
 †Siderofungia irregularis
 †Sierritasuchus – type locality for genus
 †Sierritasuchus macalpini – type locality for species
 †Sinonia
 †Sinonia levis
 †Siphodictyum
 Siphotextularia
 †Siphotextularia washitaensis
  †Skolithos
 Smilotrochus
 †Smilotrochus palmerae – type locality for species
 †Solanocrinites
 †Solanocrinites wertheimi
 Solemya
 †Solemya bilix – tentative report
 †Solenoceras
 †Solenoceras multicostatum
 †Solenoceras reesidei
 †Solenoceras texanum
 †Solyma
 †Solyma bilix
 †Solyma elliptica
 †Solyma gardnerae
 †Solyma parva
 †Solyma stewarti
 †Spalacotheroides – type locality for genus
 †Spalacotheroides bridwelli – type locality for species
 †Spathites
 †Spathites coahuilaensis
 †Spathites rioensis
 †Specus
 †Specus fimbriatus
  †Sphenodiscus
 †Sphenodiscus intermedius
 †Sphenodiscus lobatus
 †Sphenodiscus pleurisepta
 †Sphenodiscus tirensis
 †Spinosuchus – type locality for genus
 †Spinosuchus caseanus – type locality for species
 †Spironema
 †Spironema perryi
 Spiroplectammina
 †Spiroplectammina ammovitrea
 †Spiroplectammina goodlandana
  Spondylus
 †Spondylus hilli
 †Spondylus munitus
 †Spondylus siccus – type locality for species
  Squalicorax
 †Squalicorax kaupi
 †Squalicorax pristodontus
  Squalus
 †Squalus huntensis – type locality for species
 †Squatigaleus
 †Squatigaleus sulphurensis – type locality for species
 †Squatirhina
 †Squatirhina americana
 †Stamenocella
 †Stantonella
 †Stantonella interrupta
 †Stearnsia
 †Stearnsia robbinsi
 †Stelidioseris
 †Stelidioseris bellensis – type locality for species
 †Stelidioseris pattoni – type locality for species
 †Stelidioseris whitneyi – type locality for species
 †Stellatopollis
 †Steorrosia
 †Steorrosia aspera
 Stephanocoenia – tentative report
 †Stephanomorpha – tentative report
 †Stephanomorpha saxirotundi – type locality for species
 †Stoliczkaia
 †Stoliczkaia argonautiformis
 †Stoliczkaia conlini – type locality for species
 †Stoliczkaia crotaloides
 †Stoliczkaia scotti
 †Stoliczkaia texana – type locality for species
 Stomatopora
 †Stomohamites – tentative report
 Striarca
 †Striarca cuneata
 †Striarca plummeri
 †Striarca saffordi
 †Striarca webbervillensis
 †Striaticostatum
 †Striaticostatum bexarense
 †Striaticostatum pondi
 †Striaticostatum sparsum
  †Struthiomimus – or unidentified comparable form
 †Suarodon
 †Sumitomoceras
 †Sumitomoceras bentonianum
 †Syncyclonema
 †Syncyclonema archeri
 †Syncyclonema kingi
 †Syncyclonema simplicius
 †Syncyclonema travisanus
 †Synorichthys – tentative report
 †Synorichthys stewarti

T

 †Tancredia – tentative report
 †Tanyosphaeridium
 †Tanyosphaeridium salpinx
 †Tarrantites
 †Tarrantites adkinsi
 †Tarrantoceras
 †Tarrantoceras cuspidum
 †Tarrantoceras sellardsi
 †Tarsomordeo – type locality for genus
 †Tarsomordeo winkleri – type locality for species
 †Technosaurus – type locality for genus
 †Technosaurus smalli – type locality for species
 †Tecovasaurus – type locality for genus
 †Tecovasaurus murryi – type locality for species
 †Tecovasuchus – type locality for genus
 †Tecovasuchus chatterjeei – type locality for species
 Teinostoma
  Tellina
 †Tellina duganensis
 †Tellina dugansensis
 †Tellina munda
 †Tellina parkerana
 †Tellina patula
 †Tellina rivana
 †Tellina stabulana
 †Tellinimera
 †Tellinimera buboana
 †Tellinimera gabbi
 †Tellinimera munda
 †Tenea
 †Tenea parilis
 †Tenea patula
  †Tenontosaurus
 †Tenontosaurus dossi – type locality for species
 †Tentontosaurus
 †Tenuipteria
 †Tenuipteria argentea
 †Tenuipteria argenteus
 Terebratulina
 †Terebratulina filosa
 †Terebratulina noackensis
 †Terebrimya
 †Terebrimya lamarana
  Teredolites
 †Terlinguachelys – type locality for genus
 †Terlinguachelys fischbecki – type locality for species
  †Terminonaris
 †Terminonaris robusta – or unidentified comparable form
 †Tetragonites
 †Tetragonites brazoensis – type locality for species
 †Texabatis – type locality for genus
 †Texabatis corrugata – type locality for species
 †Texacephale – type locality for genus
 †Texacephale langstoni – type locality for species
 †Texagryphea
 †Texanites
 †Texanites dentatocarinatum
 †Texanites gallicus
 †Texanites vanhoepeni
 †Texasetes – type locality for genus
 †Texasetes pleurohalio – type locality for species
 †Texasia
 †Texasia dartoni
 †Texicaprina
 †Texicaprina vivari
 †Texigryphaea
 †Texigryphaea sashitaensis
 †Texigryphea
 †Texigryphea washitaensis
  Textularia
 †Textularia losangica
 †Textularia rioensis
  †Thamnasteria
 †Thamnasteria hoffmeisteri – type locality for species
 †Thamnoseris – tentative report
 †Thamnoseris morchella – type locality for species
 †Thecosmilia – tentative report
 †Thomasites
 †Thomasites adkinsi
 †Thomelites
 †Thryptodus
 †Thryptodus loomisi – type locality for species
 †Thylacus
 †Thylacus cretaceus
 †Thyracella
 †Tiarasmilia – type locality for genus
 †Tiarasmilia casteri – type locality for species
 †Tibiaporrhais – tentative report
 †Tibiaporrhais cooperensis
 †Tintorium
 †Tintorium pogodaformis – or unidentified comparable form
 †Titanosarcolites
 †Titanosarcolites oddsensis
 †Tornatellaea
 †Tornatellaea cretacea
 †Tornatellaea eretacea
 †Tornatellaea eretacea appressa
 †Tornatellaea gramdis
 †Tornatellaea scatesi
 †Toucasia
 †Toucasia hancockensis
 †Toucasia texana
 †Tovula
 †Tovula microlirae
 †Trachybaculites
 †Trachybaculites columna
  Trachycardium
 †Trachycardium eufaulensis
 †Trachycardium tinninense
 †Trachyscaphites
 †Trachyscaphites densicostatus – type locality for species
 †Trachyscaphites porchi
 †Trachyscaphites spiniger
  †Triceratops
 †Triceratops utahensis – or unidentified comparable form
 †Trigonarca – tentative report
  †Trigonia
 †Trigonia clavigera
 †Trigonia emoryi
 †Trigonia goodellii
 †Trigonia munita
 †Trigonia proscabra
 †Trigonia stantoni
 †Trigonia vyschetzkii
  †Trilophosaurus – type locality for genus
 †Trilophosaurus buettneri – type locality for species
 †Trilophosaurus jacobsi
   †Trinacromerum – type locality for genus
 †Trinacromerum bentonianum – type locality for species
 †Trinitichelys – type locality for genus
 †Trinitichelys hiatti – type locality for species
  †Triodus
 †Triodus moorei
 †Triopticus – type locality for genus
 †Triopticus primus – type locality for species
 †Tristix
 †Tristix gigantea
 †Tristix quadrata
  †Trochactaeon
 †Trochactaeon cumminsi
 Trochocyathus
 †Trochocyathus gardnerae – type locality for species
 †Trochocyathus scottianus – type locality for species
 †Trochocyathus sellardsi – type locality for species
 †Trochocyathus taylorensis – type locality for species
 †Trochocyathus wintoni – type locality for species
 †Trochocyathus woolmani
 †Trochoseris
 †Trochoseris shattucki – type locality for species
 †Trochosmilia
 †Trochosmilia stainbrooki – type locality for species
 †Troostella
 †Troostella brevispira
 †Troostella sublinearis
 Tryonia
 †Tryonia valida
 †Tundora
 †Tundora tuberculata
 Turboella
 †Turboella crebricostata
 †Turboella tallahatchiensis
 †Turgidodon
 †Turgidodon lillegraveni – or unidentified comparable form
  †Turrilites
 †Turrilites acutus
 †Turrilites saudersorum
  Turritella
 †Turritella anstini
 †Turritella bilira
 †Turritella delriensis
 †Turritella forgemoli – or unidentified comparable form
 †Turritella hilgardi
 †Turritella houstonia
 †Turritella macnairyensis
 †Turritella marnochi
 †Turritella paravertebroides
 †Turritella quadrilira
 †Turritella seriatimgranulata
 †Turritella shuleri
 †Turritella trilira
 †Turritella vertebroides
 †Turritella vertebroides jonesi
 †Turritella winchelli
 †Turseodus – tentative report
  †Tylosaurus
 †Tylosaurus kansasensis
 †Tylosaurus nepaeolicus
 †Tylosaurus proriger – or unidentified comparable form
 †Typothorax
  †Tyrannosaurus
 †Tyrannosaurus rex

U

 †Uddenia
 †Uktenadactylus
 †Uktenadactylus wadleighi – type locality for species
 †Unicardium
 †Unicardium concentricum
 Unio
  †Upogebia
 †Upogebia rhacheochir
 †Urceolabrum
 †Urceolabrum mantachieensis – tentative report
 †Urceolabrum tuberculatum
 †Ursirivus
 †Ursirivus arlingtonanus
 †Ursirivus fannensis
 †Ursirivus fanninensis

V

 Vaginulina
 Valvulineria
 †Valvulineria asterigerinoides
  †Vancleavea
 †Vancleavea campi
 †Vascellum
 †Vascellum elegans
 †Vascellum fortispirae
 †Vascellum leve
 †Vascellum magnum
 †Vascellum minusculum
 †Vascellum mundum
 †Vascellum mundum subteres
 †Vascellum pingue
 †Vascellum procerum
 †Vascellum rivanum
 †Vascellum robustum
 †Vascellum subleve
 †Vascellum tensum
 †Vascellum vascellum
 †Vascellum vascellum pressulum
 †Vascellum vascellum subornatum
 †Vascellum vianum
  †Vascoceras
 †Vascoceras cauvini – or unidentified comparable form
 †Vascoceras proprium
 †Vascoceras silvanense
 Venericardia
 †Venericardia uvaldana
 †Veniella
 †Veniella conradi
 †Veniella lineata
 †Vetericardiella
 †Vetericardiella crenalirata
 †Vetericardiella webbervillensis
 †Vicarya
 †Vinella
  Viviparus – tentative report
 Volsella
 †Volsella alveolana
 †Volsella modesta
 †Volsella tarrantana
 †Volsella uddeni
 †Volutomorpha
 †Volutomorpha aspera
 †Volutomorpha conradi
 †Volutomorpha graysonensis
 †Volutomorpha retifera
 †Voysa
 †Voysa compacta
 †Voysa constricta
 †Voysa eulessana
 †Voysa lepida
 †Voysa minor
 †Voysa planolata
 †Voysa savoiana
 †Voysa speciosa
 †Voysa varia
 †Voysa varia extensa
 †Voysa varia levicostae
 †Voysa varia nodosa
 Vulsella
 †Vulsella alveolana
 †Vulsella tarrantana

W

 †Wadeopsammia
 †Wadeopsammia nodosa
   †Wannchampsus – type locality for genus
 †Wannchampsus kirpachi – type locality for species
 †Wannia
 †Wannia scurriensis – type locality for species
 †Washitaster
 †Washitaster longisulcus
 †Weeksia
 †Weeksia lubbocki
 †Woodbinax
 †Woodbinax texanus
 †Woodbinesuchus – type locality for genus
 †Woodbinesuchus byersmauricei – type locality for species
 †Worthoceras
 †Worthoceras gibbosum
 †Worthoceras vermiculum – or unidentified comparable form
 †Wrightoceras
 †Wrightoceras munieri

X

 Xanthosia
 †Xanthosia pawpawensis
 †Xanthosia reidi
 †Xanthosia wintoni
 †Xenacanthus – report made of unidentified related form or using admittedly obsolete nomenclature
 Xenophora
  †Xiphactinus
 †Xylophagella
 †Xylophagella whitneyi

Y

 †Yezoites
 †Yezoites subevolutus
 Yoldia
 †Yoldia septariana
 †Yoldia subacuta

References

 

Texas
Mesozoic
Texas-related lists